Graeme Jennings (11 July 1946 – 21 August 1993) was an Australian fencer. He competed at the 1968 Summer Olympics.

References

1946 births
1993 deaths
Australian male fencers
Olympic fencers of Australia
Fencers at the 1968 Summer Olympics
20th-century Australian people